Abbey of Saint Pons may refer to:

Abbey of Saint-Pons de Nice
Abbey of Saint-Pons-de-Thomières